Charles Samuel Swartz (April 22, 1939 – February 10, 2007) was an American filmmaker, researcher, and academic. He was raised in Dallas, earned a degree from Yale University and did graduate work at the University of Southern California. At USC he met and married another film student, Stephanie Rothman. He and Rothman worked together on a number of films for Roger Corman and were involved in the establishment of Dimension Pictures.

Swartz later became an important figure in the development of digital cinema, writing the textbook Understanding Digital Cinema: A Professional Handbook (2004) and working at the research centre of the University of Southern California Entertainment Technology Centre from 2003–2007. He died of pneumonia following a battle with brain cancer.

Filmography 
 It's a Bikini World (1967) – producer, co-writer
 Gas-s-s-s (1970) – production assistant
 The Student Nurses (1970) – producer, writer
 The Velvet Vampire (1971) – producer, writer
 Group Marriage (1973) – producer
 The Working Girls (1974) – producer

Bibliography 
 Charles S. Swartz (editor), Understanding digital cinema. A professional handbook, Elseiver / Focal Press, Burlington, Oxford, 2005, xvi + 327 p.

References

External links

'Entertainment Industry Leader Charles S. Swartz Passes Away: Veteran Producer, Innovator, and Communicator Shaped Landmark Entertainment Technology Center at USC' USC News February 13, 2007

American film producers
1939 births
2007 deaths